Ikomoniya "Biko" Botowamungu (born 22 January 1957) is a former boxer from Austria. Born in Stanleyville, Belgian Congo, he competed at the 1988 Summer Olympics in Seoul, South Korea in the super-heavyweight (+ 91 kg) division where he was defeated by Riddick Bowe of the United States in his opening bout. Botowamungu was Austrian amateur champion in heavyweight (1983) and super-heavyweight (1984-1989 and 1992).

Botowamungu had a professional boxing record of 10 wins, 16 losses and a draw.

In his homeland, Botowamungu was a wrestler. He was to compete in the 1976 Summer Olympics in that sport, representing Zaire but the African nation did not compete in Montreal, citing economic reasons.

After coming to Austria, for a time he became a professional wrestler known as "Dr. Biko". Later, Botowamungu became a Baptist minister. He also appeared on Dancing Stars.

Professional boxing record

References

External links
 
 
 Boxen Seoul 88 Olympia Biko Botowamungo vs Riddick Bowe

1957 births
People from Kisangani
Democratic Republic of the Congo emigrants to Austria
Boxers at the 1988 Summer Olympics
Heavyweight boxers
Super-heavyweight boxers
Living people
Olympic boxers of Austria
Austrian male boxers
Democratic Republic of the Congo male sport wrestlers
Austrian male professional wrestlers
21st-century Baptist ministers